The Worshipful Company of Brewers is one of the livery companies of the City of London. London brewers are known to have organised as a group in the 13th century. Their first royal charter was granted by Henry VI in 1438. In 1643, Parliament imposed excise taxes on beer, ale, and malt, steadily increasing them until gin became cheaper, causing the growth of unlicensed breweries and, in 1685, James II extended the company's jurisdiction to eight miles around London and its suburbs. In 1739 it adopted new by-laws, which included the requirement for members to "enter into a bond [...] with the company against any expenses of their being elected to the office of sheriff or lord mayor". The company started to go into decline about 1750.

They are the trustees of the Dame Alice Owen Foundation, which supports Dame Alice Owen's School. The Brewers' Company ranks 14th in the order of precedence of Livery Companies. The company's motto is In God Is All Our Trust.

The current Brewer's Hall was built in 1960, after bombing in 1940 destroyed the previous building. The company's first hall was destroyed by the Great Fire of London in 1666.
Located in Aldermanbury Square the hall is now available on a private hire basis for events.

See also 
Masters of the Worshipful Company of Brewers

References

External links
 The Worshipful Company of Brewers

Brewers
1437 establishments in England